LIP6 may refer to:

 DNAJC14, protein DnaJ homolog subfamily C member 14
 Laboratoire d'Informatique de Paris 6, research centre